The Stara Pavlica Monastery is a medieval Serbian Orthodox monastery located in Pavlica, Raška, in south Serbia on a rocky plateau above the Ibar River, six kilometres north of the town of Raška. 

It is believed to have originated in the pre-Nemanjić Dynasty at the end of the 11th century. The monastery is first mentioned in the charter of King Stefan the First Crowned, and parts of the church were restored during the 1970s. The monastery church is dedicated to the holy Apostles Peter and Paul.

References

12th-century Serbian Orthodox church buildings
Nemanjić dynasty endowments
Raška District
Serbian Orthodox monasteries in Serbia
Monasteries of the Eparchy of Žiča
Cultural Monuments of Great Importance (Serbia)